Crowley's Ridge State Park is a  Arkansas state park in Greene County, Arkansas in the United States atop Crowley's Ridge. Located on the former homesite of pioneer Benjamin Crowley, the park contains many excellent examples of the work done by the Civilian Conservation Corps in the 1930s. One of Arkansas's most popular state parks, the parks is bisected by Crowley's Ridge Parkway, a National Scenic Byway. The site became a state park in 1933 in an effort to honor Crowley and the heritage of the Crowley's Ridge area.

Recreation

The park was originally constructed in the 1930s by the Civilian Conservation Corps and the original stone and log structures give the park a rustic feel.  The park offers a  fishing lake originally constructed by the Arkansas National Guard and which is well stocked with channel catfish and largemouth bass by the Arkansas Game and Fish Commission. The park also has a  spring-fed swimming lake which is one of the most popular swimming areas in Arkansas.

The park has modern cabins with kitchens, picnic areas, a dining hall, snack bar, and other amenities.  The park also provides group accommodations for up to 60 person groups. Five bunk cabins, four fully modern duplex-style cabins with kitchens, 18 Class B and 8 tent sites serve as lodging facilities.

National Register of Historic Places

The bathhouse, bridge, comfort station, and dining hall are separately listed on the National Register of Historic Places:
Crowley's Ridge State Park-Bathhouse
Crowley's Ridge State Park-Bridge
Crowley's Ridge State Park-Comfort Station
Crowley's Ridge State Park-Dining Hall

See also

 List of Arkansas state parks

References

State parks of Arkansas
Crowley's Ridge Park
Protected areas of Greene County, Arkansas
State parks of the U.S. Interior Highlands
National Register of Historic Places in Greene County, Arkansas
Parks on the National Register of Historic Places in Arkansas
Civilian Conservation Corps in Arkansas
1937 establishments in Arkansas
Protected areas established in 1937